A business channels is a television channel that concentrate on business news.

List of channels

 North America

Bloomberg Television (produced by Bloomberg L.P.)
BNN Bloomberg (Canadian channel produced by Bell Media)
Cheddar
CNBC (produced by NBCUniversal)
Biz Television
Fox Business Network (produced by Fox Corporation)

 Asia

Business TV Nepal (Nepalese channel produced by Business Television)
Business Plus (Pakistani channel owned by Salman Taseer and his family)
BTVI (Indian channel)
CCTV-2 (Chinese channel)
CNBC Asia
CNBC Indonesia (Indonesian channel)
CNBC TV18 (Indian channel)
EBC Financial News (Taiwanese channel)
Ekhon (Bangladeshi channel)
ET Now (Indian channel produced by the Times Group)
Maldives Business Network (MBN) (Maldivian channel)
NDTV Profit (Indian channel)
TTV Finance (Taiwanese channel)

 Europe

CNBC Europe
Económico TV (former Portuguese channel produced by Ongoing Strategy Investments)

 Other

 CNBC Arabiya
 CNBC Africa
 CNBC World

See also
Business journalism
Business publications

Business-related television channels